Canada–India relations also referred to as Indo-Canadian relations, are the bilateral relations between Canada and India. According to the Canadian Government, these relations are built upon a "mutual commitment to democracy", "pluralism", and "people-to-people links." In 2009, bilateral trade between India and Canada was at about C$4.14 billion. Most notably, the bombing of Air India Flight 182 by Canadian residents, killing a number of Canadian citizens, had effects on relations for about 20 years. India's Smiling Buddha nuclear test added strains to the relationship between the two nations, with allegations that India broke the terms of the Colombo Plan. Although Jean Chrétien and Roméo LeBlanc both visited India in the late 1990s, relations were again halted, albeit temporarily, after the Pokhran-II tests. India and Canada are taking steps to become strategic partners, with Prime Minister Stephen Harper making a state visit in 2012 and Prime Minister Justin Trudeau making one in 2018. Both are former British colonies and full members of the Commonwealth of Nations, with Canada being home to one of the largest Indian diasporas in the world along with being India's top overseas study destination.

History
Indians migrants settled on the west coast from the late 19th century. See Indo-Canadians

In the 1940s and 1960s Canada–India relations were enhanced because of the personal ties which developed between Indian Prime Minister Jawaharlal Nehru and two Canadian Prime Ministers who served during those years: Louis St. Laurent and Lester B. Pearson. At the United Nations and in the Commonwealth, on issues as diverse as the Korean War armistice and the Suez Crisis, there was a convergence of interest and commitment between India and Canada. Canada's aid programme to India began in 1951 and grew substantially under the Colombo Plan. Canada provided food aid, project financing and technical assistance to India. In the past five decades India has been one of the largest recipients of Canadian bilateral aid, amounting to over $3.8 billion Canadian dollars. In the 1960s, Canada supported the Kundah hydro-electric power house project through Colombo Plan.

Indo-Canadian relations deteriorated in the wake of India's Smiling Buddha nuclear test of May 1974 when the Canadian government severed bilateral nuclear cooperation with both India and Pakistan in 1976 after claims that the fissionable material used to construct India's first nuclear device had been obtained from the Canadian-supplied CIRUS nuclear research reactor. Thereafter Canada resolved to engage in nuclear cooperation only with countries which signed the Treaty on the Non-Proliferation of Nuclear Weapons (NPT) and the Comprehensive Nuclear-Test-Ban Treaty (CTBT), and which instituted full-scope safeguards on their nuclear energy programmes under the supervision of the International Atomic Energy Agency (IAEA). India and Pakistan are two nations that have both consistently refused to sign the NPT, and voted against UN General Assembly Resolutions which they claim violates their nation's sovereign right to choose whether or not to sign such treaties. In early February 1997, Foreign Minister I.K.Gujral re-iterated India's opposition to the treaty, saying that "India favours any step aimed at destroying nuclear weapons, but considers that the treaty in its current form is not comprehensive and bans only certain types of tests". At that time, Canada persistently refused to engage in nuclear co-operation with India and Pakistan until and unless they sign the treaty ended its nuclear collaboration with India for the time being, and severely damaged relations between the two nations. However, in 2010, the signing of the Nuclear Cooperation Agreement (NCA) between the two countries started a new era of engagement. A follow-on agreement was signed in 2015 to supply 3000 metric ton Uranium concentrate to India under five-year contract.

Indira Gandhi was the second Indian prime minister to make a joint session of the Canadian Parliament, on 19 June 1973. Pandit Jawaharlal Nehru was the first on 24 October 1949.

The bombing by Sikh separatists of Air India Flight 182 in 1985 resulted in Canada and India maintain a bilateral dialogue on anti-terrorism, including an annual meeting of the Canada-India Strategic Dialogue, as well as regular meetings of the aforementioned Canada-India Working Group on Counter-Terrorism.

In the 1990s, a chance to improve Indo-Canadian relations arose when India instituted major reforms of its economy. India went through a large economic liberalisation, which attracted the attention of the Canadian government and the business community. Canadian Prime Minister Jean Chrétien paid a diplomatic mission to India in January 1996 with two cabinet ministers and 300 business figures. India's External Affairs Minister Inder Kumar Gujral paid an official visit to Canada in September 1996. Foreign Affairs Minister Lloyd Axworthy reciprocated with a visit to India in January 1997 during which he inaugurated the Office of the Canadian High Commission in Chandigarh, capital of Punjab and Haryana states. The Canada-India Working Group on Counter- Terrorism was also established in 1997, bringing together on an annual basis several departments and agencies of the Canadian and Indian governments. Former Governor General Roméo LeBlanc undertook a state visit to India in March 1998. Prime Minister Stephen Harper took an official visit to India in November 2009. The Canada India Foundation has been active since 2007 in fostering support for stronger bi-lateral relations between Canada and India. Indian Prime Minister Manmohan Singh visited Canada in June 2010 for the G20 Summit in Toronto.

2011 was dubbed the "Year of India in Canada," a joint initiative by both governments. Under this auspice, in June 2011, the Indo-Canada Chamber of Commerce co-hosted with the government of India the regional Pravasi Bhartiya Divas, a conference of the diaspora. This conference hosted over 1,000 delegates from India and Canada's governmental, business, medical, scientific, and philanthropic sectors. This event was followed up by the International Indian Film Academy Awards held in Toronto in June 2011.

Prime Minister Justin Trudeau spent a week in India on a state visit in February 2018. Most commentators called it a failure or a disaster because of Canadian tolerance for the Sikh separatists operating in Canada.

In December 2020, Trudeau expressed concerns about the handling of farmer protests by the Indian government. Trudeau stated that "Canada will always there to defend the right of peaceful protestors" and expressed support for "the process of dialogue." In response, the Indian Ministry of External Affairs stated that Prime Minister Trudeau's comments were "an unacceptable interference in our internal affairs".

Trade relationship 

Canada and India enjoy a prosperous trading relationship. Since 2004, despite the late-2000s recession, trade has increased by over 70%. In 2009, Canadian exports to India totalled C$2.1 billion, while in the same year Canadian imports from India totalled C$2.0 billion, giving Canada a C$100 million trade surplus. India celebrated the year 2012 as year of India in Canada to promote business, cultural and political relations with India.

Despite the warm relationship, trade between Canada and India is less than their potential. India accounts for less than 1% of Canada's total export and total import in 2014, with bilateral trade of C$5.77 billion in 2014 (compared to more than C$56 billion bilateral trade between China and Canada).  Nevertheless, total trade between the two countries grows steadily over the past 5 years.

Canada and India are currently holding negotiations on the Comprehensive Economic Partnership Agreement (CEPA) to improve the trade relations between the two countries. As of March 2015, the two countries held their 9th round of negotiations in New Delhi.

Canada's Merchandise Trade with India 2015

Resident diplomatic missions 
As both countries are members of the Commonwealth of Nations, Canada and India exchange high commissioners rather than ambassadors. 

 Canada has a high commission in New Delhi and consulates-general in Bengaluru, Chandigarh and Mumbai.
 India has a high commission in Ottawa and consulates-general in Toronto and Vancouver.

Air connectivity 
Air Canada operates non-stop flights from Toronto, Montreal, and Vancouver to Delhi, and from Toronto to Mumbai. In September 2019, Air India resumed its nonstop flights from Delhi to Toronto, and in October 2020 began scheduled flights from Delhi to Vancouver. Indian carrier Vistara has expressed interest in flying nonstop from Delhi to Toronto as its first North American destination, while Canadian carrier WestJet has noted India as part of its expansion plans with the Boeing 787 Dreamliner. In May 2022, Union Aviation Minister Jyotiraditya Scindia met with Canadian Transport Minister Omar Alghabra to discuss an open skies policy between the two countries.  This would allow unlimited flights between Canada and India.

See also
 Indo-Canadians

References

Further reading
 Budhwar, Prem K. et al. "India-Canada Relations: a Roller-Coaster Ride." Indian Foreign Affairs Journal 13.1 (2018): 1-50. online  essays by seven experts
 
 Coward, Howard, ed. Peace. Development and Culture: Comparative Studies of lndia and Canada (Calgary: Shastri Indo-Canadian Institute. 1988). 
 Dobell, W. M. "Canada and India: The Mulroney Years." Journal of Asian and African Studies 25.3-4 (1990): 131-145.
 Edwards, Lucie. "The lady is a tiger: Canada's erratic courtship of India." Canadian Foreign Policy Journal 18#3 (2012): 264–266.
 Grewal, J.S. and Hugh Johnston, eds. The India-Canada Relationship -- Exploring Political, Economic and  Cultural Dimensions (London: Sage/Shastri Indo-Canadian Institute, 1994).
 Gupta, Ashis, ed. Canada-lndia Opportunities - Selected 1988 Conference Proceedings, (University of Calgary, 1988)
 
 
 Reid, Escott. Envoy to Nehru (Toronto: Oxford University Press, 1981).
 Rubinoff, Arthur, ed. Canada and South Asia: Political and Strategic Relations (University of Toronto Press, 1992).
 Rubinoff, Arthur G. "Canada's re-engagement with India." Asian Survey 42.6 (2002): 838–855. online
 Rudner, Martin. "The Canada‐India nexus: Trade and development assistance in Canada's new foreign policy framework." Canadian Foreign Policy Journal 3.2 (1995): 33-50.
 Singh, Milan, and Anita Singh. "Diaspora, political action, and identity: A case study of Canada’s Indian diaspora." Diaspora: A Journal of Transnational Studies 17.2 (2014): 149-171. online
 Touhey, Ryan. Conflicting Visions: Canada and India in the Cold War World, 1946-76 (U British Columbia Press, 2015)

External links

 Canada–India relations, Government of Canada

 
Bilateral relations of India
India